The Minister of Petroleum and Energy  is a councilor of state and chief of the Norway's Ministry of Petroleum and Energy. The current minister is Terje Aasland. The ministry is responsible for the government's energy policy, including management of Norway's energy resources, including the valuable deposits of petroleum and hydroelectricity. Major subordinate agencies and companies include the Water Resources and Energy Directorate, the Petroleum Directorate, Petoro, Gassnova, Gassco, Enova, Statnett and a partial ownership of Statoil. The position was created on 11 January 1978 as a response to the increased importance of oil on the Norwegian continental shelf. The position was merged with the Minister of Trade and Industry between 1992 and 1996.

The position has been held by seventeen people from five parties. No person has held the position for at least three years, resulting in one of the most volatile positions in the cabinet. Kåre Kristiansen holds the longest tenure, as one of six to have held the position for more than two years. The position has been a favorite of the Centre Party, who has claimed it in all coalition governments they have participated in except Willoch II. The position has overall been held longer by the Centre Party than the Labour Party.

Key
The following lists the minister, their party, date of assuming and leaving office, their tenure in years and days, and the cabinet they served in.

Ministers

References

Petroleum and Energy